Gene Mayer (born May 11, 1956) is a former tennis player from the United States who won 14 professional singles titles during his career.

Mayer was born in Flushing, Queens, New York. He grew up in Wayne, New Jersey, and played tennis at Wayne Valley High School, where he went unbeaten in his two years on the tennis team. He was a double hander on both forehand and backhand.

The right-hander Mayer reached his highest ranking on the ATP Tour on October 6, 1980, when he reached the rank of World No. 4.

Mayer has been a resident of Woodmere, New York. In 2005, he was inducted into the Nassau County Sports Hall of Fame.

Gene's older brother Sandy was also a tour player. He achieved the rank of World No. 7 in 1982. They met each other in the Stockholm Open final 1981 and won 5 doubles tournaments together, including 1979 French Open.

Career finals

Singles: 26 (14 wins, 12 losses)

Doubles: 24 (15 wins, 9 losses)

References

External links
 
 
 

1956 births
American male tennis players
French Open champions
Living people
American people of German descent
People from Woodmere, New York
People from Wayne, New Jersey
Wayne Valley High School alumni
Sportspeople from Queens, New York
Stanford Cardinal men's tennis players
Tennis people from New Jersey
Tennis people from New York (state)
Wimbledon champions
Grand Slam (tennis) champions in men's doubles
Sportspeople from Nassau County, New York
Sportspeople from Passaic County, New Jersey